Ntoroko is a town officially known as Kanara Town Council in Ntoroko District Western Uganda. It is one of the four town councils of Ntoroko District the others being Karugutu, Rwebisengo and Kibuku Town Council.
Ntoroko is the largest fishing town on the southern Mwitanzige (Lake Albert) shore. Its located on the Ntoroko bay extending from Kanara Fishing village to the western half of the Ntoroko Peninsula (the eastern half making part of the Tooro Semliki Wildlife reserve). The peninsular also separates Ntoroko bay from the Muziizi Bay.
By Road, Ntoroko town is approximately 84 KM Northwest of Fort Portal City, the regional Capital and approximately 79 KM via Karugutu, north of Kibuku Town Council the District Capital.
Ntoroko/Kanara Town Council is settled by (like most Ugandan lake shore towns) many ethnicities, the largest being;
Rwenzori Peoples; Batooro/Batuku, Bakonzo, Bamba, Babwisi.
Bunyoro peoples; Bagangaizi,Bagungu and other Banyoro.
Alur, Lendu and Ngite.
Congolese of the Western Mwitanzige shore; Alur, Gegere, Nande, to mention but a few.

Location
The geographical coordinates of Ntoroko town are: 1°03'00.0"N, 30°32'06.0"E (Latitude:1.0500; Longitude: 30.5350).

Overview
Ntoroko is a small town officially Called Kanara Town Council on the southern shores of Mwitanzige/ Lake Albert. The town sits at an altitude of 623 meters, above sea level. The predominant ethnicities in the town are the Batooro/Batuku and the Bakonzo. However other ethnicities coexist with them including the Bamba/Babwisi Bakiga, Banyoro and the Banyarwanda. Ntoroko was elevated to a town council and officially renamed Kanara Town Council when Ntoroko District, in July 2010, was created from Bundibugyo District.

Points of interest
The following points of interest are found in or near Ntoroko: (a) SDV Transami Ntoroko (b) the offices of Kanara Town Council (c) Ntoroko Central Market, the largest source of fresh produce in the town (d) the southern shores of Lake Albert (e) the mouth of river Wasa (f) the Muziizi escuary (g) Tooro Semliki Wildlife reserve (h) Semliki Safari Lodge (i) Ntoroko peninsular and beach (j) Kijura-Muziizi escarpment, John Baruga recreation center, Sande Kitebere refreshment center and a hospitable population.

See also

References

External links
  Location of Ntoroko at Google Maps
 Ntoroko Locals Await Oil News

Populated places in Western Region, Uganda
Cities in the Great Rift Valley
Ntoroko District